Gulgula, is a village in Telavi district of Georgia. The village is located near the Alazani Valley.

Demography

See also
 Telavi Municipality

External links

References 

Populated places in Telavi Municipality